Caloptilia cruzorum is a moth of the family Gracillariidae. It is known from the Galápagos Islands.

The larvae feed on Galactia species, probably Galactia striata. They mine the leaves of their host plant.

References

cruzorum
Gracillariidae of South America
Moths described in 2006